Laddingford is a hamlet in the parish of Yalding  in Kent, England. Laddingford Aerodrome is located nearby.

Hamlets in Kent